Gabi on the Roof in July is a 2010 American independent comedy-drama film directed by Lawrence Michael Levine.

Synopsis
Gabi (Sophia Takal), a rambunctious Oberlin undergrad, heads to New York City to spend the summer with her older brother, Sam (Lawrence Michael Levine).

Cast
 Sophia Takal as Gabi
 Lawrence Michael Levine as Sam
 Brooke Bloom as Madeline
 Louis Cancelmi as Garrett
 Amy Seimetz as Chelsea
 Kate Lyn Sheil as Dory
 Lena Dunham as Colby
 Robert White as Charles
 Tarajia Morrell as Astrid
 Jay DePietro as Phil

Production 
The dialogue in the film is both scripted and improvised.

Reception
Gabi on the Roof in July has been generally well received by critics. On Rotten Tomatoes the film holds a 73% rating based on 11 reviews. 
Steve Dollar, writing for The Wall Street Journal, noted that the film is "wisely observant of human nature as it bounces between the leads, "Gabi" evokes Woody Allen with a more generous heart."

Release
The film premiered at the  Cinequest Film Festival on February 27, 2010.

References

External links
 Official site
 

2010 films
2010 comedy-drama films
American comedy-drama films
American independent films
Films set in New York City
2010 independent films
Films directed by Lawrence Michael Levine
2010s English-language films
2010s American films
English-language comedy-drama films